Mack Town is a town in West Grand Bahama, in The Bahamas.

See also 
Grand Bahama
West Grand Bahama

References 

Commonwealth of the Bahamas website

Populated places in the Bahamas